Raúl Alberto Lastiri (11 September 1915 – 11 December 1978) was an Argentine politician who was interim president of Argentina from July 13, 1973 until October 12, 1973. Lastiri, who presided over the Argentine Chamber of Deputies, was promoted to the presidency of the country after Héctor Cámpora and Vicente Solano Lima resigned, he organized new elections and delivered the country's government to Juan Perón, who won with over 60% of the votes.

Biography

Rise to power
His brief tenure marked a turn towards right-wing policies and factions within the Peronist Party. His father-in-law, José López Rega, a P2 member and the creator of the paramilitary organization Triple A, was confirmed as Minister of Social Welfare. Alberto Juan Vignes replaced Puig in the Ministry of Foreign Affairs and Benito Llambí took over from Esteban Righi as Minister of Interior. In spite of this, Argentine foreign policy kept a Third World orientation; for example, in August 1973, Argentina granted Cuba a 200 million US$ loan to buy machinery and cars.

José Ber Gelbard, also confirmed as Economy Minister, continued with his previous policy, nationalizing bank deposits and announcing a "Triennial Plan" for development.

Anti-government violence experienced sustained growth in the last days of his presidency. On September 25 a Montoneros commando allegedly killed José Ignacio Rucci, Secretary-General of the CGT National trade union center and Perón's good friend. The same month, the Ejército Revolucionario del Pueblo (ERP) had assaulted the Army medical unit located at Parque Patricios, a neighborhood of Buenos Aires, killing an officer. This action served to justify the ERP illegalization and the closedown of the newspaper El Mundo.

Propaganda Due
Lastiri was on Licio Gelli's list of P2 members, a masonic lodge, discovered in 1980.

References

Initial version translated from Enciclopedia Libre - Raúl Alberto Lastiri (in Spanish), under GFDL.

|-

|-

1915 births
1978 deaths
People from Buenos Aires
Argentine people of Italian descent
Presidents of Argentina
Presidents of the Argentine Chamber of Deputies
Members of the Argentine Chamber of Deputies elected in Buenos Aires
Justicialist Party politicians
Deaths from lymphoma
Deaths from cancer in Argentina
Burials at La Chacarita Cemetery